The 2005 Vuelta a España was the 60th edition of the Vuelta a España, one of cycling's Grand Tours. The Vuelta began in Granada, with an individual time trial on 27 August, and Stage 11 occurred on 6 September with a stage to Cerler. The race finished in Madrid on 18 September.

Stage 1
27 August 2005 — Granada to Granada,  (ITT)

Stage 2
28 August 2005 — Granada to Córdoba,

Stage 3
29 August 2005 — Córdoba to Puertollano,

Stage 4
30 August 2005 — Ciudad Real to Argamasilla de Alba,

Stage 5
31 August 2005 — Alcázar de San Juan to Cuenca,

Stage 6
1 September 2005 — Cuenca to Valdelinares,

Stage 7
2 September 2005 — Teruel to Vinaròs,

Stage 8
3 September 2005 — Tarragona to Lloret de Mar,

Stage 9
4 September 2005 — Lloret de Mar to Lloret de Mar,  (ITT)

Stage 10
5 September 2005 — La Vall d'en Bas to Ordino-Arcalis,

Stage 11
6 September 2005 — Andorra to Cerler,

References

2005 Vuelta a España
Vuelta a España stages